Vlăduț Simionescu (born 30 April 1990 in Iași, Romania) is a Romanian judoka. He competed at the 2012 Summer Olympics in the +100 kg event.

References

External links

 
 

1990 births
Living people
Romanian male judoka
Olympic judoka of Romania
Judoka at the 2012 Summer Olympics
Judoka at the 2020 Summer Olympics
Sportspeople from Iași
Universiade medalists in judo
Universiade bronze medalists for Romania
Judoka at the 2015 European Games
European Games competitors for Romania
Judoka at the 2019 European Games
20th-century Romanian people
21st-century Romanian people